Andrian Pavlov Dushev (born June 6, 1970) is a Bulgarian sprint canoer who competed from the 1989 to 2000.

Republican champion many times during his career he was first called up to the national team of Bulgaria in 1989. In the same year he became a consultant at the “Levsky”-Sofia Sports Club (Canoe-Kayak).

Achievements
1989 World Championships in Plovdiv, Bulgaria: K-4 500 m: bronze, K-2 500 m – 4th, K-2 1000 m – 4th, K-2 10000 m – 4th.
1990 World Championships in Poznań, Poland: K-1 500 m: 7th.
1995 World Championships in Duisburg, Germany: K-2 500 m – 5th, K-2 1000 m – 4th, K-1 200 m: 4th;
1996 Summer Olympics in Atlanta: K-2 1000 m – bronze, K-2 500 m – 8th.
1997 European Championships in Plovdiv, Bulgaria: K-2 1000m – bronze, K-2 500 m – 8th.
1997 World Championships in Dartmouth, Canada: K-1 200 m – 5th.
1999 European Championships in Zagreb, Croatia: K-4 500 m – silver, K-4 1000 m – silver, K-4 200 m – 7th.
1999 World Championships in Milan, Italy: K-4 1000 m – 5th.
2000 European Championships in Poznań, Poland: K-4 1000 m – bronze.

Between 1989 and 2000 Dushev was also part of the K-4 Bulgarian crew at the European and World Championships.

He was named as one of the ten best kayak sprinters of Bulgaria in the 20th century. He has received many awards from the President of the Republic of Bulgaria and is a winner of a medal for Olympic service awarded by the Bulgarian Olympic Committee.

References
Olympic database profile

Sports-reference.com profile

1970 births
Bulgarian male canoeists
Canoeists at the 1996 Summer Olympics
Living people
Olympic canoeists of Bulgaria
Olympic bronze medalists for Bulgaria
Olympic medalists in canoeing
ICF Canoe Sprint World Championships medalists in kayak
Medalists at the 1996 Summer Olympics